Luis Aldás (10 March 1910 – 16 May 1990) was an Argentine film actor. He emigrated to Mexico and became a star during the Golden age of Mexican cinema. He appeared in more than fifty films during his career. Aldás was married four times. His wives included the Mexican actress Virginia Serret,  the Brazilian actress Leonora Amar and the Mexican singer Lucy Gallardo.

Selected filmography
 The Night of the Mayas (1939)
 The Coward (1939)
 Three Men of the River (1943)
 My Memories of Mexico (1944)
 He Who Died of Love (1945)
 Zorina (1949)
 The Lovers (1951)
The Boxer (1958)

References

Bibliography
 Pitts, Michael. Western Movies: A Guide to 5,105 Feature Films. McFarland, 2012.

External links

1910 births
1990 deaths
Argentine male film actors
Argentine emigrants to Mexico
20th-century Argentine male actors
Argentine people of Basque descent